Xu Yanshu (born 14 July 1998) is a Chinese rhythmic gymnast. She qualified for the 2020 Summer Olympics, in Women's rhythmic group all-around. 

She competed at the  2017 Rhythmic Gymnastics World Championships,  2018 Rhythmic Gymnastics World Championships, and 2019 Rhythmic Gymnastics World Championships.

References

External links 
 (L - R) Hu Yuhui, Xu Yanshu, Liu Xin, Huang Zhangjiayang, Guo Qiqi and Hao Ting of China National Rhythmic Gymnastics Team pose for a portrait ahead of the 2020 Tokyo Olympic Games 

1998 births
Living people
Chinese rhythmic gymnasts
Gymnasts at the 2020 Summer Olympics
Olympic gymnasts of China
21st-century Chinese women